Stuart Hall High School is a Catholic all boys college-preparatory high school located in San Francisco, California. It opened in the fall of 2000 and together with the Convent of the Sacred Heart High School and Convent Elementary forms Convent & Stuart Hall, part of an international network of schools known as the Schools of the Sacred Heart.

Academics
Stuart Hall High School operates by a block schedule; theology, ethics and social justice classes are mandatory for graduation. Heavy emphasis is placed on community involvement, service, critical thinking, respect for intellectual values, and self-development.

Each Stuart Hall High School student completes four years of English, history, mathematics, theology, and philosophy/religion; three years of lab science and international language; two years of physical education and fine arts; and one year of computer science.

As part of the Schools of the Sacred Heart network, SHHS has accepted the IB curriculum, and began it in the 2016-17 school year. Students also have a choice of AP courses, including art history, biology, calculus, chemistry, comparative government/politics, computer science, English language/composition, environmental science, European history, French language, French literature, human geography, music theory, physics, psychology, Spanish language, Spanish literature, studio art, US government/politics and US history.  Students participate with Convent High School in many co-ed activities, including classes.

Notable people

Alumni

Staff
Henry H. Neff, author of The Tapestry children's book series

See also

San Francisco County high schools

References

External links
Stuart Hall High School Website
The RoundTable, Stuart Hall High School's Newspaper
Flying the Colors, a Collection of Letters to the Board by community members
The Hall at a Glance

Boys' schools in the United States
Catholic secondary schools in California
Educational institutions established in 2000
High schools in San Francisco
Sacred Heart schools in the United States
Private high schools in California
2000 establishments in California